Myzostoma is a genus of marine worms in the family Myzostomidae. They are parasitic on crinoids.

Species
The following species are classified in this genus:
Myzostoma abundans Graff, 1883
Myzostoma adhaerens Remscheid, 1918
Myzostoma agassizii Graff, 1883
Myzostoma alatum Graff, 1884
Myzostoma ambiguum Graff, 1887
Myzostoma antarcticum Stummer-Traunfels, 1908
Myzostoma antennatum Graff, 1884
Myzostoma areolatum Graff, 1883
Myzostoma armatae Grygier, 1989
Myzostoma aruense Remscheid, 1918
Myzostoma asteriae Marenzeller, 1895
Myzostoma asymmetricum Graff, 1884
Myzostoma atrum Atkins, 1927
Myzostoma attenuatum Grygier, 1989
Myzostoma australe Rouse, 2003
Myzostoma beardi Graff, 1887
Myzostoma belli Wheeler, 1897
Myzostoma bicaudatum Greeff, 1883
Myzostoma bicorne Remscheid, 1918
Myzostoma bocki Jägersten, 1937
Myzostoma brachiatum Graff, 1877
Myzostoma brevicirrum Graff, 1884
Myzostoma brevilobatum Jägersten, 1937
Myzostoma brevipes Graff, 1883
Myzostoma bucchichii Wagner, 1887
Myzostoma calycotyle Graff, 1884
Myzostoma caribbeanum Graff, 1883
Myzostoma carinatum Graff, 1883
Myzostoma carpenteri Graff, 1884
Myzostoma cerriferoidum McClendon, 1907
Myzostoma chelonium McClendon, 1906
Myzostoma chelonoidium McClendon, 1906
Myzostoma chinesicum Graff, 1884
Myzostoma circinatum Wheeler, 1897
Myzostoma cirricostatum Jägersten, 1937
Myzostoma cirriferum Leuckart, 1836
Myzostoma cirripedium Graff, 1885
Myzostoma clarki McClendon, 1906
Myzostoma compressum Graff, 1884
Myzostoma coriaceum Graff, 1884
Myzostoma cornutum Graff, 1877
Myzostoma coronatum Graff, 1884
Myzostoma costatum Leuckart, 1830
Myzostoma crenatum Graff, 1883
Myzostoma cristatum Remscheid, 1918
Myzostoma cryptopodium Wheeler, 1897
Myzostoma cubanum McClendon, 1907
Myzostoma cuniculus Eeckhaut, Grygier & Deheyn, 1998
Myzostoma cysticolum Graff, 1883
Myzostoma deani McClendon, 1906
Myzostoma deformator Graff, 1884
Myzostoma dentatum Graff, 1884
Myzostoma divisor Grygier, 1989
Myzostoma dubium Graff, 1887
Myzostoma echinus Graff, 1884
Myzostoma elegans Graff, 1877
Myzostoma elongatum Graff, 1877
Myzostoma eremita Wheeler, 1897
Myzostoma evermanni McClendon, 1907
Myzostoma excisum Graff, 1883
Myzostoma fasciatum Remscheid, 1918
Myzostoma filicauda Graff, 1883
Myzostoma fimbriatum Graff, 1884
Myzostoma fisheri Wheeler, 1905
Myzostoma fissum Graff, 1884
Myzostoma folium Graff, 1884
Myzostoma furcatum Graff, 1887
Myzostoma fuscomaculatum Lanterbecq, Hempson, Griffiths & Eeckhaut, 2008
Myzostoma gardineri Atkins, 1927
Myzostoma gerlachei Fauvel, 1936
Myzostoma giganteum Nansen, 1885
Myzostoma gigas Luetken in Graff, 1884
Myzostoma glabrum Leuckart in Graff, 1877
Myzostoma gopalai Subramaniam in George, 1943
Myzostoma graffi Nansen, 1885
Myzostoma holotuberculatum Jägersten, 1940
Myzostoma horologium Graff, 1884
Myzostoma ijimai Hara & Okada, 1921
Myzostoma inflator Graff, 1883
Myzostoma ingolfi Jägersten, 1940
Myzostoma insigne Atkins, 1927
Myzostoma intermedium Graff, 1884
Myzostoma irregulare Graff, 1883
Myzostoma japonicum McClendon, 1906
Myzostoma labiatum Graff, 1884
Myzostoma laingense Eeckhaut, Grygier & Deheyn, 1998
Myzostoma lobatum Graff, 1877
Myzostoma longimanum Jägersten, 1934
Myzostoma longipes Graff, 1883
Myzostoma longitergum Eeckhaut, Grygier & Deheyn, 1998
Myzostoma luetkeni Graff, 1884
Myzostoma maculatum Jägersten, 1937
Myzostoma marginatum Graff, 1883
Myzostoma mertoni Remscheid, 1918
Myzostoma metacrini McClendon, 1906
Myzostoma moebianum Graff, 1884
Myzostoma mortenseni Jägersten, 1940
Myzostoma murrayi Graff, 1883
Myzostoma nanseni Graff, 1887
Myzostoma nigrescens Graff, 1884
Myzostoma nigromaculatum Eeckhaut, Grygier & Deheyn, 1998
Myzostoma oblongum Graff, 1883
Myzostoma pallidum Graff, 1877
Myzostoma parasiticum Leuckart, 1827
Myzostoma pentacrini Graff, 1884
Myzostoma pictum Graff, 1883
Myzostoma platypus Graff, 1887
Myzostoma plicatum Graff, 1884
Myzostoma pluvinar von Graff, 1884
Myzostoma polycyclus Atkins, 1927
Myzostoma pottsi Atkins, 1927
Myzostoma pseudocuniculus Lanterbecq & Eeckhaut, 2003
Myzostoma pseudogigas Jägersten, 1940
Myzostoma pulvinar Graff, 1884
Myzostoma quadricaudatum Graff, 1884
Myzostoma quadrifilum Graff, 1884
Myzostoma radiatum Graff in Clark, 1921
Myzostoma robustum Okada, 1921
Myzostoma rotundum Graff, 1883
Myzostoma rubrofasciatum Graff, 1884
Myzostoma schultzeanum Diesing, 1858
Myzostoma seymourcollegiorum Rouse & Grygier, 2005 (note that this species has not been verified by a taxonomic editor)
Myzostoma smithi McClendon, 1906
Myzostoma stochoeides Atkins, 1927
Myzostoma striata George, 1943
Myzostoma sulcatum Remscheid, 1918
Myzostoma taeniatum Remscheid, 1918
Myzostoma tentaculatum Jägersten, 1940
Myzostoma tenuispinum Graff, 1884
Myzostoma terminale Jägersten, 1937
Myzostoma testudo Graff, 1883
Myzostoma thompsoni Diesing, 1858
Myzostoma toliarense Lanterbecq & Eeckhaut, 2003
Myzostoma triste Graff, 1887
Myzostoma tuberculatum Jägersten, 1937
Myzostoma tuberculosum Semper, 1859
Myzostoma vastum Graff, 1883
Myzostoma verrucosum Graff, 1877
Myzostoma vincentinum Reichensperger, 1906
Myzostoma viride Atkins, 1927
Myzostoma wheeleri McClendon, 1906
Myzostoma willemoesii Graff, 1884
Myzostoma wyvillethompsoni Graff, 1884

Synonyms
According to the World Register of Marine Species, the genus Myzostomun is a synonym of this genus.

References 

Polychaetes